Harold P. Darcy (10 July 1929 in Newark, Essex County, New Jersey – 23 December 1997 in South Orange, New Jersey) was an American Roman Catholic priest who served as the rector of the Pontifical North American College in Rome from 1974 to 1979. Monsignor Darcy was a priest of the Archdiocese of Newark, New Jersey.

Biography
Prior to his service as rector of the Pontifical North American College, Monsignor Darcy was rector of Immaculate Conception Seminary at Seton Hall University from 1972 to 1974.

References

External links
Harold P. Darcy at Flickr

Living people
20th-century American Roman Catholic priests
21st-century American Roman Catholic priests
Roman Catholic Archdiocese of Newark
Pontifical North American College rectors
1929 births
Religious leaders from New Jersey